This is a list of countries by population in 1000. The bulk of these numbers are sourced from Alexander V. Avakov's Two Thousand Years of Economic Statistics, Volume 1, pages 12 to 14, which cover population figures from the year 1000 divided into modern borders. Avakov, in turn, cites a variety of sources, mostly Angus Maddison.

See also
List of countries by population
List of countries by population in 1500
List of countries by population in 1600
List of political entities in the 10th century

Bibliography
 
.

Notes

References

1000
1000